Jonkheer Charles Joseph Marie Ghislain de Brouckère (18 January 1796 – 20 April 1860) was a Belgian nobleman and liberal politician.

Born in Bruges, elder brother of future Prime Minister of Belgium Henri de Brouckère, Charles entered politics in the period when modern Belgium formed the southern part of the United Kingdom of the Netherlands. He worked as a banker in Maastricht and served as a representative for the province of Limburg in the Second Chamber of parliament.

During the Belgian Revolution of 1830, De Brouckère was among the francophile, francophone party which favoured annexation by France. In the newly independent Belgium, he served as Finance minister, Interior Minister, and War Minister, for short periods in 1831. He taught as a professor at the Université Libre de Bruxelles, and in 1848 became mayor of the City of Brussels, a post he held continuously until his death. He is interred at Brussels Cemetery.

De Brouckère was responsible for major urban renewal in Brussels, including the creation of water mains, as well as the first boulevards in the city. Today, the Place de Brouckère/De Brouckèreplein, and De Brouckère station, in central Brussels, are named after him.

Honours
 : Iron Cross.
 : Grand Officer in the Order of Leopold

See also
 List of mayors of the City of Brussels
 List of defence ministers of Belgium

Sources
 Du Bois, A., Les Bourgmestres de Bruxelles. Ch. de Brouckère, in : Revue de Belgique, mei 1896, pp. 21–41.
 Juste, Théodore, Charles de Brouckère, Brussel, C. Muquardt, 1867, p. 131.

1796 births
1860 deaths
Politicians from Bruges
Mayors of the City of Brussels
Members of the National Congress of Belgium

Belgian nobility
19th-century Belgian politicians
Burials at Brussels Cemetery
Belgian Ministers of Defence
Finance ministers of Belgium